Dorchester is a city in Grayson County, Texas, United States. The population was 148 at the 2010 census, up from 109 at the 2000 census. It is part of the Sherman–Denison Metropolitan Statistical Area.

Geography

Dorchester is located in southern Grayson County at  (33.531613, –96.698999).

Demographics

As of the census of 2000, there were 109 people, 43 households, and 31 families residing in the city. The population density was 108.9 people per square mile (42.1/km2). There were 47 housing units at an average density of 47.0 per square mile (18.1/km2). The racial makeup of the city was 92.66% White, 7.34% from other races. Hispanic or Latino of any race were 11.01% of the population.

There were 43 households, out of which 37.2% had children under the age of 18 living with them, 65.1% were married couples living together, 2.3% had a female householder with no husband present, and 27.9% were non-families. 27.9% of all households were made up of individuals, and 11.6% had someone living alone who was 65 years of age or older. The average household size was 2.53 and the average family size was 3.13.

In the city, the population was spread out, with 31.2% under the age of 18, 5.5% from 18 to 24, 32.1% from 25 to 44, 22.0% from 45 to 64, and 9.2% who were 65 years of age or older. The median age was 34 years. For every 100 females, there were 94.6 males. For every 100 females age 18 and over, there were 102.7 males.

The median income for a household in the city was $45,000, and the median income for a family was $67,083. Males had a median income of $42,000 versus $26,750 for females. The per capita income for the city was $16,947. There were 9.7% of families and 7.9% of the population living below the poverty line, including 10.6% of under eighteens and none of those over 64.

Education
Until 1959, Dorchester had its own school, originally built in 1902 (a state historical marker stands at the school's old location, next to the current home of the First Baptist Church of Dorchester). The high school closed in 1940, but the elementary school remained for nearly 20 more years, when the Dorchester school merged with the Howe Independent School District. The Howe district continues to educate students in the area today. The Dorchester Dragon's School Song was originally written by Emily Juanita Stewart. She currently resides in Howe, Texas. Russell Wortham of Howe, TX is the last known recipient of the coveted "Dorchester Dragon Spirit Award" which was presented in 2010. This award was presented to
 The Howe High School student whom displayed the highest level of "Dragon Spirit" amongst the students enrolled in the Dorchester and Howe areas.

References

Cities in Grayson County, Texas
Cities in Texas